Luis Carlos Paz Moreno (born 25 June 1942, died 27 June 2015) was a Colombian footballer. He competed for the Colombia national football team at the 1962 FIFA World Cup which was held in Chile. He was 19 years old when he was called up for the squad, making him the youngest Colombian ever to be named to or play for at a World Cup. He died aged 73, of a heart attack, while vacationing with his family at a hotel resort in Puracé-Coconuco in the mountains in southern Colombia.

References

External links
 Luis Paz at playmakerstats.com (formerly thefinalball.com)

1939 births
2015 deaths
Colombian footballers
Colombia international footballers
1962 FIFA World Cup players
Categoría Primera A players
Deportivo Cali footballers
América de Cali footballers
Deportes Quindío footballers
Once Caldas footballers
Independiente Santa Fe footballers
Millonarios F.C. players
Real Cartagena footballers
Deportes Tolima footballers
Association football midfielders
Footballers from Cali